The ARIA Music Award for Best Cover Art, is an award presented within the Artisan Awards at the annual ARIA Music Awards.  The ARIA Awards recognise "the many achievements of Aussie artists across all music genres", and have been given by the Australian Recording Industry Association (ARIA) since 1987.

The award is given to the designer who is from, or resides in Australia, and has overall responsibility for the album covers' design concept. The graphics that appear on the cover must be an original work that was designed in Australia. The accolade is restricted to album recordings that have met the general eligibility criteria (however, in 2000 and 2012 single covers were included in the final nominations list). Best Cover Art is voted for by a judging academy, which consists of 1000 members from different areas of the music industry.

Winners and nominees
In the following table, the winner is highlighted in a separate colour, and in boldface; the nominees are those that are not highlighted or in boldface. Nominees from 1988 are not available in published sources.

The years listed in the first column relate to the year and edition of the awards ceremony. The second column indicates the graphic artist(s) responsible for the covers' design (although the current rules (as of 2011) state that only the graphic designer who has had overall responsibility for the album covers' design concept may be eligible for nomination, multiple artists have been nominated in previous ceremonies). The "Album title and original recording artist(s)" column names the album whose cover art has been nominated, and its original recording artist; the musician is not the nominee unless they were the designer.

References

External links
The ARIA Awards Official website

C
A